Brian Dunning (21 December 1951 – 10 February 2022) was an Irish flautist and composer, largely known for being a member of the Celtic band Nightnoise. He had both Celtic and jazz influences early on. He studied jazz and classical music, and was a student of James Galway. He studied at the Berklee College of Music in 1977.

Dunning played the flute and panpipe in Puck Fair, a primarily instrumental "Irish jazz" group formed in New York in 1984 that played traditional Irish songs and original compositions. They released the album Fairplay on the Lost Lake Arts/Windham Hill label in 1987, with Dunning on flute and drummer Tommy Hayes on bodhran, joined by various musicians including Mícheál Ó Domhnaill. The group was later reformed in Dublin with Dunning, guitarist Sean Whelan, and percussionist Robbie Harris, releasing the album Forgotten Carnival on their own label in 2008. He collaborated with keyboardist Jeff Johnson since the late 1980s, recording several albums together, including Songs from Albion (1992), The Music of Celtic Legends – the Bard and the Warrior (1997), Byzantium (2000), and Patrick (2004).

Brian was a member in the extraordinary band Nightnoise since 1987

Dunning can be heard on the [[Gangs of New York (soundtrack)|soundtrack to Gangs of New York]], Windhorse, and The Outcasts.

Dunning died on 10 February 2022, at the age of 70.

See also
 Jeff Johnson

Selected Discography
 With Jeff Johnson and Wendy Goodwin 
 Under the Wonder Sky (2010)
 Winterfold (2013)
 If I Do Not Remember... (2016)
 Kohelet (2020)
 Coming, Going'' (2022)

References

External links
 
 

1952 births
2022 deaths
Berklee College of Music alumni
Irish classical flautists
Irish composers
Nightnoise members